The AeroKuhlmann Scub is a single engine, high wing utility aircraft built in France in the 1990s.

Design and development

The Scub is a high wing light utility aircraft, capable of cargo, medical, mapping, agricultural and surveillance work. It is powered by a single 62.5 kW (83.3 hp) JPX 4TX75A flat four engine and seats two in tandem with dual control. It has a conventional layout, with a straight edged wings carrying 2° of dihedral. The short span ailerons extend to the squared-off tips. The wings are of mixed construction, based on a single 3-ply birch spar with a carbon fibre cap combined with glass fibre ribs. The leading edge is plywood, the rest covered with Dacron. The wings fold for storage.

The fuselage of the Scub is a chrome-molybdenum steel tube structure, Dacron covered and flat sided. The tapered, square topped vertical stabilizer has a horn balanced rudder. The starboard elevator carries a trim tab.  The Scub has a conventional, fixed undercarriage without wheel fairings. Floats or skis may be fitted instead; the conversion takes about 2 hours. Floats add 50 kg (110 lb) to the empty weight.  For agricultural work, Micronair 7000 atomisers are fitted on underwing bars, fed from a bulbous ventral tank. Surveillance cameras can be mounted underwing.

The Scub first flew on 5 May 1996. It was certified to JAR-VLA standard in France. In 2000, it was available either as an Ultralight, with maximum take-off weights (MTOW) of 450 kg (992 lb) in Europe or 544 kg (1.200 lb) in USA, or with a MTOW of 598 kg (1,320 lb).

Operational history

The Scub had its first public outing at the 1997 Paris Airshow and by mid-1999 17 had been built. Several have been used in Madagascar for crop spraying. In mid-2010, 8 were on the European civil registers.

Specifications (MTOW, landplane)

References

1990s French civil utility aircraft
High-wing aircraft
Aircraft first flown in 1996